Nicky Evans (born 20 April 1979) is an English actor who is best known for playing the roles of Shane Maguire on Channel 4's hit comedy drama Shameless and Roy Glover on the ITV soap opera, Emmerdale. He has also played roles in various dramas such as The Bill, The Royal, Eddie Spears (2004), Burn It and Clocking Off.
In 2015, Nicky completed the role of Dragon in British Crime Thriller The Contract''. The Film was released in January 2016.

References

External links

English male soap opera actors
1979 births
Living people
Male actors from Bradford